Ongal Peak is a sharp glaciated peak rising to 1151 m on Levski Ridge of Tangra Mountains, Livingston Island in the South Shetland Islands, Antarctica. It surmounts Shipka Valley on the north-northwest, and Huron Glacier and its tributaries on the north and northeast.

The peak was first ascended and surveyed on 21 December 2004 by the Bulgarian Lyubomir Ivanov from Camp Academia. It was named after the historic Ongal region of the First Bulgarian Empire located in the Danube Delta area and north of the Black Sea, in connection with the Battle of Ongal.

Location
Ongal Peak is located 520 m north of Levski Peak, 1.76 km southeast of Zograf Peak, 650 m south of Komini Peak, 1.19 km south of Ravda Peak and 2.44 km west-southwest of Plana Peak. Bulgarian topographic survey Tangra 2004/05, and mapping in 2005, 2009, 2017 and 2023.

Maps
 South Shetland Islands. Scale 1:200000 topographic map. DOS 610 Sheet W 62 60. Tolworth, UK, 1968.
 Islas Livingston y Decepción.  Mapa topográfico a escala 1:100000.  Madrid: Servicio Geográfico del Ejército, 1991.
 L.L. Ivanov et al., Antarctica: Livingston Island, South Shetland Islands (from English Strait to Morton Strait, with illustrations and ice-cover distribution), 1:100000 scale topographic map, Antarctic Place-names Commission of Bulgaria, Sofia, 2005
 L.L. Ivanov. Antarctica: Livingston Island and Greenwich, Robert, Snow and Smith Islands. Scale 1:120000 topographic map. Troyan: Manfred Wörner Foundation, 2010.  (First edition 2009. )
 Antarctic Digital Database (ADD). Scale 1:250000 topographic map of Antarctica. Scientific Committee on Antarctic Research (SCAR), 1993–2016.
 L.L. Ivanov. Antarctica: Livingston Island and Smith Island. Scale 1:100000 topographic map. Manfred Wörner Foundation, 2017. 
 A. Kamburov and L. Ivanov. Bowles Ridge and Central Tangra Mountains: Livingston Island, Antarctica. Scale 1:25000 map. Sofia: Manfred Wörner Foundation, 2023.

Gallery

Notes

References
 L.L. Ivanov, Livingston Island: Tangra Mountains, Komini Peak, west slope new rock route; Lyaskovets Peak, first ascent; Zograf Peak, first ascent; Vidin Heights, Melnik Peak, Melnik Ridge, first ascent. The American Alpine Journal, 2005, pp. 312-315. ISSN 0065-6925
 Antarctica: Livingston Island, Climb Magazine, Issue 14, Kettering, UK, April 2006, pp. 89-91.
 Bulgarian Antarctic Gazetteer. Antarctic Place-names Commission. (details in Bulgarian, basic data in English)

External links
 Ongal Peak. Adjusted Copernix satellite image

Mountains of Antarctica
Tangra Mountains